Finlay Bridge opened on May 14, 1908 in Medicine Hat, Alberta. Spanning 274 meters (900 ft) across the South Saskatchewan River, the traffic and pedestrian bridge connects Medicine Hat's north side to the south side.  Upon completion it was largest steel bridge in Western Canada and is officially listed on the Alberta Register of Historic Places. It is named after William Thomas Finlay, a local politician who was the most vocal advocate for the bridge's construction.

Prior to Finlay Bridge completion, Medicine Hat residents had to choose between either the CP Rail bridge or a ferry, operated by the North-West Mounted Police, to get from one side of the city to the other.  Both were risky options and the ferry route was only open 6 months of the year due to winter freezing.

During the devastating 2013 Southern Alberta floods Finlay Bridge was closed amid fears that flood waters could reach and damage the structure. Medicine Hat was almost "split in two" for the first time in over a hundred years as all major bridges connecting the north to the south were scheduled to be shut down due to the historic flooding of 2013.

See also 
List of crossings of the South Saskatchewan River

References 

Medicine Hat
Road bridges in Alberta
Steel bridges in Canada
Truss bridges in Canada
Bridges completed in 1908